Klinga mina klockor is a song with music by Benny Andersson and lyrics by Björn Ulvaeus. It appeared on the 1987 album "Klinga mina klockor".

The song stayed at Svensktoppen for five weeks between 7 February-6 March 1988, peaking at 5th position.

In 2009, the song was recorded by Elisabeth Andreassen on the album Spellemann.

References

1987 songs
Elisabeth Andreassen songs
Songs written by Benny Andersson and Björn Ulvaeus
Swedish-language songs